William Oliver (December 26, 1860 – April 27, 1951) worked in construction in Lethbridge and served as the seventh mayor of Lethbridge, Alberta, Canada. Born in Oxford County, Ontario, Oliver moved to Lethbridge in 1886. Two years later, he married Amelia, with whom he had three sons. After she died in 1912, Oliver married Margaret C. Cossaboom, and had a son with her.

Oliver served as mayor 1902–1905. Under his administration (as well as the mayor before him), Lethbridge secured its first waterworks and sewage disposal system. Outside of his mayoral term, he built houses. He owned Oliver Block and Oliver Apartments.

References

1860 births
1951 deaths
Mayors of Lethbridge
20th-century Canadian politicians